The Tatra K5AR was an articulated tramcar built by ČKD Tatra.  It was unusual in that it was one of the few tramcars built by ČKD Tatra to be exported outside of Warsaw Pact, and was designed specifically for the city of Cairo, Egypt, which took 200 examples.  The K5AR was bi-directional and was fitted with 3 doors in each car, and its electrical equipment was designed to withstand the sub-tropical climate of Egypt.  After less than a decade in service, the vast majority of these tramcars were in very poor condition owing to over-loading and poor maintenance, and only a small handful remained in service until the mid-1980s.

References

Tatra trams